Frederick Fiebig was a photographer, best known for his photographs of India, Sri Lanka, Mauritius, and South Africa taken in the 1850s.

History
There is very little information available about Frederick Fiebig. He was probably of German origin and became a lithographer in Calcutta in the 1840s. He should not be confused with his contemporary and German compatriot, the Letton born post impressionist and expressionist painter Frédéric Fiebig. He was possibly also a piano teacher for a time. With the advent of photography, Fiebig began producing hand-coloured prints of photographs captured using the calotype process. His photographs of Calcutta are some of the earliest views of the city. He later travelled to Madras, Colombo and Kandy in Sri Lanka, Mauritius, and Cape Town in South Africa, meticulously cataloguing the monuments and people around him. The East India Company acquired roughly 500 of his photographs in 1856 which are now part of the Oriental and India Office collections at the British Library.

Gallery

See also
 Samuel Bourne
 John Burke (photographer)
 Linnaeus Tripe

Bibliography 

 John Hannavy, Encyclopedia of nineteenth-century photography, New York : Routledge, 2008.

References

External links 
 Frederick Fiebig, Calcutta

19th-century German photographers